Al Sapienza is an American actor who has had numerous roles in television, stage and film productions. He is best known for his role as Mikey Palmice on the HBO series The Sopranos as well as for his role as Marty Spinella, a lobbyist for the teachers' union in the Netflix series House of Cards. He played the role of Jake Housman in the North American premiere of the stage version of Dirty Dancing.

Filmography

Film

Television

Video games

References

External links
 Official website of Al Sapienza
 

Year of birth missing (living people)
American male film actors
American people of Italian descent
American male television actors
Living people
New York University alumni
Male actors from New York City
American expatriates in Canada
20th-century American male actors
21st-century American male actors